Chaukhamba Mosque is a 14th-century mosque in Varanasi, Uttar Pradesh, India. This masjid is in ruins and is still used as a pilgrimage site by Muslims. Chau means four and Khamba means pillar as this Masjid has four low massive pillars towards its north eastern extremity. It was constructed during the reign of Sultan of Delhi, Feroz Shah Tughlaq (r. 1351–1388).

See also
 Alamgiri Mosque
 Ganj-e-Shaheedan Mosque

References

14th-century mosques
Mosques in Uttar Pradesh
Tourist attractions in Varanasi
Tughlaq dynasty
Buildings and structures in Varanasi
Religion in Varanasi